"Voodoo" is a song by rock band Godsmack and the third single from their self-titled album. The song was written by the band's vocalist Sully Erna and bassist Robbie Merrill. The song was used in the MTV television program Fear.

The song was also used by WWE wrestler Batista during his time as Leviathan in the former WWE developmental territory Ohio Valley (OVW) from 2000 to 2002.

"Voodoo" is the final track listed on the album. After roughly two minutes of silence, a hidden track (entitled "Witch Hunt") closes the album. Although "Voodoo" itself is 4:40 in length, the actual length (including the aforementioned silence and the hidden track "Witch Hunt") is 9:02.

"Voodoo" has since spawned a sequel, in the form of "Voodoo Too", from the album IV.

Music video
The video, directed by Dean Karr, shows witches performing a ritual with swords. The band is shown throughout the video playing in a corn field. A naked gorgon is shown dancing, which is also part of the ritual. Zombies come out of a lake and wander through the woods. The video features Laurie Cabot and members of her coven at that time.

The idea of zombies came from the original inspiration of the song. At the House of Blues, vocalist Sully Erna stated that this inspiration was the film The Serpent and the Rainbow.

Track listing

Chart positions

Certifications

References

External links
 

1998 songs
1999 singles
Godsmack songs
Songs written by Sully Erna
Universal Republic Records singles
Songs written by Robbie Merrill